Chiripá Guarani (Tsiripá, Txiripá), also known as Ava Guarani and Nhandéva (Ñandeva), is a Guaraní language spoken in Paraguay, Brazil, and also Argentina. Nhandéva is closely connected to Mbyá Guaraní, as intermarriage between speakers of the two languages is common. Speakers of Nhandéva and Mbyá generally live in mountainous areas of the Atlantic Forest, from eastern Paraguay through Misiones Province of Argentina to the southern Brazilian states of Paraná, Santa Catarina, and Rio Grande do Sul. There are approximately 4,900 speakers in Brazil and 7,000 in Paraguay.

Nhandéva is also known as Chiripá. The Spanish spelling, Ñandeva, is used in the Paraguayan Chaco to refer to the local variety of Eastern Bolivian, a subdialect of Avá.

Phonology

Vowels 

 Vowel sounds /ɛ, a, ɨ, ɔ/ may also have realizations of [e, ɐ, ɯ, o].

Consonants 

 Prenasal sounds /ᵐb, ⁿd/ may also be realized as nasal sonorants [m, n] in front of nasal vowels.
 /j/ can be heard as [ɲ] within nasal syllables, and as a prenasal affricate [ⁿdʒ] when /j/ precedes nasal syllables in coda position.
 /j/ can be heard as [dʒ] within syllable onset before oral vowels.
 /k, kʷ/ can be heard as [ᵑɡ, ᵑɡʷ] between or after nasal vowels.
 /ts/ can also be heard as  word-medially in free variation.
 /w/ can be heard in free variation between labiodental sounds  or  among speakers of different areas.
 Sonorant sounds /w, ɾ, j/ within nasal syllables are realized as nasalized [w̃, ɾ̃, j̃].

References

Languages of Paraguay
Languages of Argentina
Guarani languages